Víctor Manuel Castillo Petit (born 8 June 1981) is a Venezuelan track and field athlete who specialises in the long jump. His personal best jump is 8.34 metres,  a Venezuelan record achieved in May 2004 in Cochabamba.  

He won the South American junior title in 2000 and rose to become the South American Champion in 2003 on home soil. At the 2003 Pan American Games, he took the bronze medal. Castillo appeared at the World Championships in Athletics that year and later represented his country at the 2004 Summer Olympics.

Won the long jump title at the Bolivarian Games. He was the bronze medallist at the 2011 Military World Games then participated at the 2011 Pan American Games. 

Tested positive for banned substance Dimetilexaniamine in 2011, the substance found in his test was fearly new added to the WADA list, he took from a pre-workout supplement doping suspension.

Career
His first international outing came at the 1998 South American Junior Championships in Athletics, where he came sixth in the long jump and was part of Venezuela's silver medal-winning 4×100 metres relay team. He returned to win the long jump gold medal at the 2000 event, beating Brazil's Thiago Dias. At the more competitive 2000 Central American and Caribbean Junior Championships in Athletics he came third with a wind-assisted mark of 7.77 m, finishing behind Leevan Sands of the Bahamas. The 2000 World Junior Championships in Athletics was held in Chile that year and Castillo made his first world-level appearance and placed fourth, just outside the medal positions.

Castillo gained eligibility to compete for the Northern Arizona University Lumberjacks: he broke the school record for the long jump and was fourth at the Drake Relays in 2003. He achieved his first success at senior level for Venezuela that year. He won the long jump title at the 2003 South American Championships in Athletics held in Barquisimeto, was fourth at the CAC Championships, and jumped his best of the year at the Pan American Games, taking the bronze medal with a mark of 7.98 m. His senior global debut followed at the 2003 World Championships in Athletics and he finished 11th in his qualifying round.

Castillo cleared eight metres twice in May 2004, first with a jump of 8.03 m in Mexico City and then a personal best and Venezuelan national record of 8.34 m in Cochabamba. He travelled to Europe and competed at top level meets, including Athletissima, before going on to finish as runner-up at the 2004 Ibero-American Championships in Athletics behind Spain's Joan Lino Martínez. He made his first appearance at the Olympics at the 2004 Athens Games, where he finished eighth in his qualifier with a jump of 7.98 m but did not make the final. He represented the NAU Lumberjacks in the 2005 indoor season and broke two national indoor records, running 6.76 seconds for the 60 metres and clearing 8.00 m for the long jump.

In 2006 Castillo was found guilty of using furosemide, a banned diuretic and so-called masking agent. The sample containing the banned substance was delivered on 27 March 2006 in an out-of-competition test. He received an IAAF suspension from June 2006 to June 2008.

Following the expiration of his ban, he returned to competition in the 2009 season. He won the gold medal at the 2009 Bolivarian Games in November, jumping a season's best of 8.25 m, and also helped Venezuela's 4×100 metres relay team to a silver medal. He made few appearances in 2010, but returned to full competition the year after. He ran a 200 metres personal best of 21.13 seconds in May at the national championships, placing third in the sprint after winning the long jump title. A jump of 7.72 m brought him fourth place at the 2011 South American Championships in Athletics and a month later he represented Venezuela at the 2011 Military World Games in Rio de Janeiro, where he took the bronze medal with a clearance of 7.81 m. With the wind right on the permissible limit, he had a jump of 8.03 m at the 2011 ALBA Games – a mark which earned him the gold medal. His season came to a peak at the 2011 Pan American Games in Guadalajara as he jumped 8.05 m (his third best ever) to secure the gold medal, becoming the second Venezuelan man to win an athletics gold at the competition (following Rafael Romero's 200 m win in 1963). Castillo came back at age 35 to jump 7.52m during the 2016 indoor season at a local meet in Elche, Spain. 

The Venezuelan Olympic Committee.

Personal bests
Outdoor
100 metres: 10.44 s (wind: -1.1 m/s) –  Caracas, 9 October 2009
200 metres: 21.22 s (wind: +0.3 m/s) –  Caracas, 7 May 2011
Long jump: 8.34 m A (wind: -1.2 m/s) –  Cochabamba, 30 May 2004
Triple jump: 15.66 m (wind: +0.2 m/s) –  Tempe, Arizona, 4 May 2003
Indoor
60 metres: 6.76 m A –  Flagstaff, Arizona, 19 February 2005
Long jump: 8.00 m A –  Flagstaff, Arizona, 5 February 2005

Achievements

See also
List of doping cases in athletics

References

External links

Tilastopaja biography

1981 births
Living people
People from Carabobo
Venezuelan male long jumpers
Athletes (track and field) at the 2003 Pan American Games
Athletes (track and field) at the 2004 Summer Olympics
Olympic athletes of Venezuela
Pan American Games bronze medalists for Venezuela
Doping cases in athletics
Venezuelan sportspeople in doping cases
Northern Arizona Lumberjacks men's track and field athletes
Pan American Games medalists in athletics (track and field)
Medalists at the 2003 Pan American Games